Biddy Mulligan the Pride of the Coombe (sometimes just called Biddy Mulligan) is a song written by Seamus Kavanagh in the 1930s, and made famous by Jimmy O'Dea.

History of the Song
The songwriter Seamus Kavanagh collaborated with the scriptwriter Harry O'Donovan, who in turn had formed a partnership with Jimmy O'Dea. Kavanagh based this piece on the song The Queen Of The Royal Coombe, which he had found in a 19th-century Theatre Royal programme. Other similarly themed songs also performed by O'Dea were The Charladies' Ball and Daffy the Belle of the Coombe, concerning Biddy Mulligan's daughter.

References

External links
'Biddy Mulligan' by The Dubliners on YouTube

Biddy Mulligan
The Dubliners songs